Crystal Peak is a mountain on the border of Lassen and Plumas Counties, California, in the middle of the northern Sierra Nevada Diamond Mountains, just a short 36 miles (as the crow flies) from its "sister" mountain of the same name in neighboring Sierra County. The mountain gets its name from its unusual summit block, which is apparently made out of solid quartz. The block rises about forty feet above the flat summit.

References

Mountains of Sierra County, California
Mountains of Northern California